Neom Bay Airport  is a commercial airport located in Neom, Saudi Arabia. It is 48 km (30 mi) east from the nearest airport, Sharm El Sheikh International Airport. It is one of the four-airport network that is projected in the city, one of which is to be international. In January 2019, the airport received 130 Saudia passengers, who were employees in Neom; this was their first visit to the project. The airport is located at Neom Bay, the first area to be constructed in the framework of the project. The International Air Transport Association (IATA) has classified the airport as a commercial hub. The airport has a logistic location as it links three countries: Saudi Arabia, Jordan and Egypt. Neom Airport is the first airport in the region to use the 5G wireless network service.

History 
The airport received its first flight on 30 June 2019, when a Saudia aircraft landed from Riyadh.

Airline and destinations

See also 

 Saudi Vision 2030
 Amaala International Airport
 Saudia

References 

Airports in Saudi Arabia